Verkhnotoretske is an urban-type settlement in Pokrovsk Raion of Donetsk Oblast in eastern Ukraine. It was formerly part of Yasynuvata Raion, and is located 24.2 km NNW from Donetsk city. Population: 

During the War in Donbas, that started in mid-April 2014, the separation line between the warring parties has been located in the vicinity of the settlement. The conflict has brought along both civilian and military casualties.

References

Yekaterinoslav Governorate

Urban-type settlements in Pokrovsk Raion